Museo Paparella Treccia Devlet (Italian for Paparella Treccia Devlet Museum)  is an art museum in Pescara, Abruzzo.

History

Collection

Notes

External links

Pescara
Museums in Abruzzo
Art museums and galleries in Abruzzo